Jacques Panciroli (born 4 December 1931) is a French bobsledder. He competed in the four-man event at the 1956 Winter Olympics.

References

1931 births
Living people
French male bobsledders
Olympic bobsledders of France
Bobsledders at the 1956 Winter Olympics
Place of birth missing (living people)